Tetiana Olehivna Malkova (née Ozhelevska; born 16 September 1988) is a Ukrainian actress and television presenter.

Biography
Malkova was born on 16 September 1988 in Kyiv. As a child, her parents sent her to a dance club. Malkova devoted 10 years to choreography and she worked as an aerial gymnast in a circus studio for a year. At the age of 17, she began to actively engage as a singer. Malkova graduated from National Pedagogical Drahomanov University and Kyiv National Economic University.

Malkova is a soloist of the group "Deva Jazz". She was also a finalist in the third season of The Voice of Ukraine. From 2011 to 2013, she was the host of programs on the "Pershiy Avtomobilny" channel where she also served as executive producer. In 2013, she was the host of the "Pydyom" program on the "Novyi Kanal" channel. From 2014 to 2016, she hosted the "Jedi" program on the "2+2" channel. From 2015 to 2017, she was an actress of the show "Made in Ukraine" of Kvartal 95 Studio.

Personal life
Malkova is married to director Dmytro Malkov and has two children.

Notes

References

External links
 

1988 births
Living people
Actors from Kyiv
Television presenters from Kyiv
Ukrainian women television presenters
Ukrainian film actresses
Ukrainian television actresses
21st-century Ukrainian actresses